The Desbrosses Street station was an express station on the demolished IRT Ninth Avenue Line in Manhattan, New York City. It had three tracks, one island platform and two side platforms. It was served by trains from the IRT Ninth Avenue Line. It opened on November 23, 1873 and closed on June 11, 1940. The next southbound stop was Franklin Street, while the next southbound express stop was Warren Street. The next northbound stop was Houston Street, while the next northbound express stop was Christopher Street. The station was located one block east of the Desbrosses Street Ferry's slip which provided connections to the railroad terminals in at Exchange Place and Pavonia.

References

IRT Ninth Avenue Line stations
Railway stations in the United States opened in 1873
Railway stations closed in 1940
Former elevated and subway stations in Manhattan
1873 establishments in New York (state)
1940 disestablishments in New York (state)